Jaime Sabines Gutiérrez (March 25, 1926 – March 19, 1999) was a Mexican contemporary poet. Known as “the sniper of Literature”  as he formed part of a group that transformed literature into reality, he wrote ten volumes of poetry, and his work has been translated into more than twelve languages. His writings chronicle the experience of everyday people in places such as the street, hospital, and playground. Sabines was also a politician.

Biography
Jaime Sabines Gutiérrez was born on March 25, 1926 in Tuxtla Gutiérrez, Chiapas. He is of Lebanese and Spanish descent.

Before he devoted himself to the study of literature, he spent three years studying medicine before moving on to his real vocation:literature, studying at UNAM Universidad Nacional Autónoma de México. Sabines was an outstanding member of the Mexican Writers Centre from 1964 to 1965 and part of the jury for the Casa de las Americas prize. In addition to his literary activity, he participated in politics and became a federal deputy for the First District of  Chiapas from 1976 to 1979, and for the Federal District in 1988. Sabines was awarded the Chiapas Award (1979), the Xavier Villaurrutia Award (1972), the Elias Sourasky Award (1982) and the National Literature Award (1983).

A collection of his work, Nuevo recuento de poemas, was issued by the publisher Joaquín Mortiz in 1977, and the Secretariat of Public Education in 1986. In 1994 he received from the Senate of Mexico the Belisario Domínguez Medal of Honor; in 1995, his selected poems, Pieces of Shadow (trans. W.S. Merwin), was brought out in a bilingual edition by Papeles Privados; and in 2004 Exile Editions (Toronto, Canada) published a bilingual volume of two early Sabines books, Adam and Eve & Weekly Diary and Poems in Prose (trans. Colin Carberry.) Octavio Paz considered him “one of the greatest contemporary poets of our [Spanish] language.”

Sabines died on March 19, 1999.

Published poetry
Horal (1950)
La señal (1951)
Adán y Eva (1952)
Tarumba (1956)
Diario semanario y poemas en prosa (1961)
Poemas sueltos (1951–1961)
Yuria (1967)
Espero curarme de ti (1967)
Tlatelolco (1968)
Maltiempo (1972)
Algo sobre la muerte del Mayor Sabines (1973)
Otros poemas sueltos (1973–1994)
Nuevo recuento de poemas (1977)
No es que muera de amor (1981)
Los amorosos: Cartas a Chepita (1983)
La luna (1988)
Love Poems Translated by Colin Carberry (2011, Biblioasis)

Awards 

1959 Chiapas, El Ateneo de Ciencias y Artes de Chiapas Prize.
1964 Scholarship granted by Centro Mexicano de Escritores (Mexican Center of Writers)
1973 Xavier Villaurrutia Award for Maltiempo.
1982 Elías Sourasky Award
1983 National Prize for Language and Literature.
1986 Juchimán de Plata Award
1991 Mexico City Medal
1994 Belisario Domínguez Medal of Honor
1996 Premio Mazatlán de Literatura, for Pieces of shadow

See also

Mexican literature

References

1926 births
1999 deaths
Mexican male poets
Mexican male writers
Writers from Chiapas
People from Tuxtla Gutiérrez
Mexican people of Lebanese descent
Recipients of the Belisario Domínguez Medal of Honor
20th-century Mexican poets
20th-century male writers
20th-century Mexican politicians
Politicians from Chiapas
Members of the Chamber of Deputies (Mexico) for Chiapas
Institutional Revolutionary Party politicians
Deputies of the L Legislature of Mexico
Members of the Chamber of Deputies (Mexico) for Mexico City